Donato may refer to:

People
Donato (surname)

As a given name
 Donato Bilancia (1951–2020), Italian serial killer
 Donato Bramante (1444–1514), Italian architect
 Donato da Cascia (fl. c. 1350 – 1370), Italian composer of trecento madrigals
 Donato di Niccolò di Betto Bardi (1386–1466), Italian sculptor
 Donato Gama da Silva (born 1962), Brazilian-Spanish footballer
 Donato Giancola (born 1967), American illustration artist
 Donato Guerra (1832–1876), leader of the Mexican Army during the time of La Reforma

Places
Donato, Piedmont, a comune in the Province of Biella, Italy
Donato Guerra, State of Mexico, a town and municipality in Mexico
San Donato di Ninea, a town and comune in the province of Cosenza in the Calabria region of southern Italy

Companies 
Donatos Pizza, American pizza company

See also
Donatus (disambiguation)
San Donato (disambiguation)

Italian masculine given names